is a 2006 Japanese animated film directed by Jōji Shimura and based on the Animal Crossing video game series. It was produced by Nintendo, OLM, Inc. and VAP and distributed by Toho. The film opened in theaters in Japan on December 16, 2006, where it went on to earn  (approximately ) at the box office.

The film retains the theme of the video games, and centers on an 11-year-old girl named Ai who moves into a village populated with animals where she works to make new friends and find her own dreams. Dōbutsu no Mori was not released outside Japan, with Nintendo of America stating in 2007 that they had no plans for an English release.

Plot
The film opens with Ai, an 11-year-old young girl, moving into the Animal Village during the summer. After being put to work by Tom Nook to deliver goods, Ai befriends four of the village's residents: Bouquet, Sally, Albert, and a human boy named Yū, participating in several activities. Ai begins to find a series of anonymous messages in bottles that state that a miracle will occur during the upcoming Winter Festival if pine trees are planted in specific points of the village. Ai complies with the messages and begins planting the trees, half-believing that the messages may have been placed by aliens.

During autumn, Bouquet scolds Ai for not attending Sally's farewell party, which comes as a big surprise. Ai becomes heartbroken, learning that Sally has moved away to embark on a career in fashion design. Ai ends up at the museum café, and ends up crying when K.K. Bossa plays, as the song reminds her of Sally. Bianca scolds Ai, and tells her that she should be happy as a friend for Sally. Ai then responds by saying that she is happy, but she is instead sad that Sally never told her anything, and leaves the café. Sally sends a letter of apology to Ai, explaining that a goodbye would have been too upsetting, and encourages her to embark on her own personal journey. Bouquet apologizes to Ai for her harsh reaction.

Winter comes, and all the pine trees that Ai has planted have fully grown and are decorated with Christmas lights. A spaceship crash-lands in the middle of the forest, and Johnny, a seagull, emerges. Johnny, who had planted the bottles in order to make an entrance dressed as an alien, asks the villagers to help locate some of the pieces that broke off his ship during the descent. Ai, Bouquet, Yū, and Albert head towards a cave, where Yū claims to have seen one of the pieces fall. The entrance, though, is blocked up by a large boulder from a recent event. Though the team tries to move the boulder, it eventually turns out it is too heavy for them to move. Sally then appears and helps unseal the cave.

The five retrieve the missing piece and return to Johnny, who they discover had already obtained them all. The missing piece turns out to be an injured UFO, one of a larger group that was attracted to the village due to the pattern formed by Ai's lit-up pine trees. The injured UFO reunites with its group, and as they depart, create a constellation in the night sky resembling Ai. Ai then wins the Winter Festival contest for the best decoration, leaving her feeling for the first time as a true member of the village.

Cast

 Yui Horie as Ai, a human girl who moves to the village
 Misato Fukuen as Bouquet, a cat who befriends Ai
 Fumiko Orikasa as Sally, an elephant who befriends Ai
 Yū Kobayashi as Yū, a human boy who lives in a neighboring village
 Takatoshi Kaneko as Albert, an alligator who is friends with Yū
 Masaki Terasoma as Apollo, a eagle whom Bianca seems to admire
  as Bianca, a wolf implied to have been in a relationship with Apollo
 Yasuhiro Takato as Saruo, a monkey who enjoys weight training
 Yūji Ueda as Sakurajima, an anteater skilled at chanson
 Kazuya Tatekabe as Alan, a gorilla skilled in enka
 Hisao Egawa as Daruman, a rockhopper penguin frequently seen fishing
 Naoki Tatsuta as Tanukichi, a tanuki who owns a shop in the village
 Kenichi Ogata as Kotobuki, an elderly tortoise and mayor of the village
 Akio Suyama as Pelio, a pelican mailman
  as Peliko, a kind pelican who works at the post office
 Yūko Mizutani as Pelimi, a rude pelican who works at the post office
 Kappei Yamaguchi as Fūta, an owl who operates the village museum 
 Mika Kanai as Fūko, an owl who operates the museum observatory 
 Takaya Hashi as Master, a pigeon who operates the museum kissaten
 Shun Oguri as Totakeke, a dog street musician. His name and appearance modeled after musician Kazumi Totaka.
  as Mr. Reset, a mole in charge of the illumination in the village.
 Junpei Takiguchi as Seiichi, a walrus painter
  as Kinuyo, a hedgehog who operates the village tailor with her sister Asami
 Saori Hattori as Asami, a hedgehog who operates the village tailor with her sister Kinuyo
 Tetsuo Sakaguchi as Tsunekichi, a kitsune who operates a black market
 Takashi Miike as Rakosuke, a sea otter philosopher 
 Wataru Takagi as Johnny, a common gull astronaut who flies around the village in a UFO
 Mitsuo Iwata as Kappei, a kappa who operates a taxicab 

Other characters, such as Shishō (Dr. Shrunk), Mr. Honma (Lyle), Maiko (Katie) and her mother (Kaitlin), and Roland (Saharah), make non-speaking appearances.

Production
Dōbutsu no Mori was first announced in a May 2006 issue of the online Japanese magazine Hochi Shimbun, with a theatrical release date set for the following December. The movie entered production due to the success of Animal Crossing: Wild World, released for the Nintendo DS the previous year, which had shipped over 3 million copies in Japan alone. Jōji Shimura was attached to direct, having previously worked on manga-to-film adaptations such Shin Angyo Onshi and Master Keaton. Some of the Animal Crossing series staff assisted with production, and worked to give the movie the same wide audience appeal as the video games themselves.

Those who ordered advance tickets before the film's debut were eligible to receive vouchers which could be redeemed for hard-to-obtain gold tools in Animal Crossing: Wild World. In October 2007, Nintendo of America made a statement that they had "no plans" to bring the film to North America.

Music
Music for Dōbutsu no Mori was contributed by Animal Crossing series composer Kazumi Totaka and arranged by Tomoki Hasegawa, with the film featuring numerous themes from the games. An official soundtrack album was released in Japan on December 13, 2006, by VAP containing 46 tracks from the movie along with five bonus songs from Animal Crossing: Wild World.

Release

Box office
Dōbutsu no Mori was released theatrically in Japan on 16 December 2006 where it was distributed by Toho. By the end of 2006, the movie had a total revenue of ¥1.526 billion ($12,915,432), becoming the 30th highest-grossing film that year in the region.

Home media
Dōbutsu no Mori was released on region 2 DVD in Japan on July 25, 2007, by VAP. First-print copies also included an Animal Crossing-themed carrying pouch.

Notes

Footnotes

References

External links

2006 anime films
2000s adventure films
Japanese adventure films
Adventure anime and manga
Animated adventure films
Animal Crossing
Anime films based on video games
Films based on Nintendo video games
Animated films about children
Animated films about cats
Animated films about elephants
Films about crocodilians
Animated films about reptiles
Toho animated films
OLM, Inc. animated films